Fairview-Clayton Park is a provincial electoral district in  Nova Scotia, Canada, that elects one member of the Nova Scotia House of Assembly. The riding was created in 2012 with 45 per cent of the former district of Halifax Fairview, 39 per cent of the former district of Halifax Clayton Park and 10 per cent of Halifax Chebucto.

The riding is primarily residential, containing new single-family homes and high-density apartment complexes favoured by people moving into the city for the first time.

Geography

Members of the Legislative Assembly
This riding has elected the following Members of the Legislative Assembly:

Election results

 

|-

|Liberal
|Patricia Arab
|align="right"| 3369
|align="right"| 46.63
|align="right"|
|-

|New Democratic Party
|Abad Khan
|align="right"| 2250
|align="right"| 31.14
|align="right"| 
|-

|Progressive Conservative
|Travis Price
|align="right"| 1294
|align="right"| 17.91
|align="right"|
|-

|-

|Independent
|Katie Campbell
|align="right"| 136
|align="right"| 1.88
|align="right"|

References

External links
 2013 riding profile

Politics of Halifax, Nova Scotia
Nova Scotia provincial electoral districts
2012 establishments in Nova Scotia